Manuel Pozzerle (born 4 February 1979) is a male Italian paralympic snowboarder who won silver medal at the 2018 Winter Paralympics.

Achievements

See also
Italy at the 2018 Winter Paralympics

References

External links
 
 
 Manuel Pozzerle at World Para Snowboard

1979 births
Living people
Italian male snowboarders
Paralympic snowboarders of Italy
Paralympic medalists in snowboarding
Paralympic silver medalists for Italy
Snowboarders at the 2018 Winter Paralympics
Medalists at the 2018 Winter Paralympics
Sportspeople from Verona
21st-century Italian people